Aratitiyopea is a monotypic genus of flowering plants, in the family Xyridaceae containing the single species Aratitiyopea lopezii. The genus was erected and described in 1984. This species is native to northern South America (Venezuela, Colombia, Peru, and northwestern Brazil).

There are two varieties of this species:

 Aratitiyopea lopezii var. colombiana (L.B.Sm.) Steyerm. & P.E.Berry - Colombia
 Aratitiyopea lopezii var. lopezii - Venezuela, Peru, northwestern Brazil

References

Xyridaceae
Monotypic Poales genera
Flora of South America